ACSD may refer to:
 Allamakee Community School District
 Amite County School District
 Anamosa Community School District
 Arlington Central School District
 Association of Christians in Student Development
 Atlantic Community School District